The L10 gas field is a major natural gas producing field and hub in the Netherlands sector of the North Sea, about 65 km west of Den Helder. The field started producing gas in 1976 and was still operational in 2021.

The field 
The L10 gas field is located in the Southern North Sea. The field was discovered by Placid International Oil Limited in February 1970. The gas reservoir is an Upper Rotliegendes sandstone at a depth of 3,772 to 3,800 metres. The properties of the gas are:

Development 
The L10 gas reservoir was developed by a number of offshore installations across the L10 Block. The L10-A complex is the hub of the field, it receives gas from its bridge-linked riser platform, from L Block satellite platforms, and from the adjacent Block 12.

The L10-A complex also receives gas from K12-C/CC, K12-D, K12-G and K12-K platforms.

Gas from the field is transported through the 178 km, 36-inch diameter Noordgastransport pipeline from the L10-A Complex to Uithuizen. The design capacity of the 36-inch pipeline is 33 million cubic metres per day.

The field was initially operated by Placid International Oil Limited, then Gaz de France Suez, then by Neptune Energy.

Decommissioning 
In June 2020 Neptune Energy announced that it had decommissioned three platforms in the L10 Field. These were the satellite platforms L10-C, L10-D and L10-G.

In December 2020 Neptune Energy began a feasibility study into whether depleted gas fields near L10-A, L10-B and L10-E could be used to sequester carbon dioxide. The capacity of the reservoirs is around 120-150 million tonnes of CO2 and the annual injection rate would be about 5-8 million tonnes per year.

See also 

 Helder, Helm and Hoorn oil fields
 Kotter and Logger oil and gas fields
K13 gas fields
L4-L7 gas fields
K7-K12 gas fields
K14-K18 gas fields

References 

North Sea energy
Natural gas fields in the Netherlands